Following is a list of senators of Territoire de Belfort, people who have represented the department of the Territoire de Belfort in the Senate of France.

Third Republic

Senators for the Territoire de Belfort under the French Third Republic were:

Fourth Republic

Senators for the Territoire de Belfort under the French Fourth Republic were:

Fifth Republic 
Senators for Territoire de Belfort under the French Fifth Republic:

References

Sources

 
Lists of members of the Senate (France) by department